Platanthera orbiculata, the round leaved orchid or lesser roundleaved orchid, is a species of orchid native to forested areas of North America. It is widespread across most of Canada and parts of the United States (Alaska, New England, Appalachian Mountains, Great Lakes Region, Rocky Mountains, Black Hills and northern Cascades).

Subspecies 

There is two accepted subspecies, Platanthera orbiculata var. macrophylla and Platanthera orbiculata var. orbiculata.

Habitat 

Platanthera orbiculata is found in moist to mesic shaded locations in forests. Each plant has two large, nearly round leaves that lie close to the ground, plus a vertical flowering stalk bearing a spike of small, white flowers.

References

orbiculata
Orchids of the United States
Orchids of Canada
Plants described in 1814
Flora without expected TNC conservation status